Zabala, also Zabalam ( zabalamki, modern Tell Ibzeikh (also Tell el-Buzekh), Dhi Qar Governorate, Iraq) was a city of ancient Sumer in what is now the Dhi Qar governorate in Iraq. In early archaeology this location was also called Tel el-Buzekh. Locally it is called Tell Bzikh. Zabala was at the crossing of the ancient Iturungal and Ninagina canals, 10 kilometers to the northwest of Umma. The city's deity was Inanna of Zabala. A cuneiform tablet from Zabala contains one of only a few metro-mathematical tables of area measures from Early Dynatic Mesopotamia.

History
The first mentions of Zabala are in seals from the Jemdet Nasr period including a list of early sites - Ur, Nippur, Larsa, Uruk, Kes, and Zabalam. The earliest historical record, a bowl inscription, indicates that Zabala was under the control of Lugalzagesi of Lagash.

In the Sargonic Period, Rimush of Akkad reports Zabala as attempting to rebel against the control of the Akkadian Empire:

Shar-kali-sharri and Naram-Sin both reported building a temple to the goddess Inanna in Zabala.

After the fall of Akkad, Zabala came into the sphere of the city-state of Isin as reported by the year names of several rulers including Itar-pisa and Ur-Ninurta. The town was later subject to Abisare of Larsa, whose year name reported the building of the
"Favorite of Inanna of Zabalam" canal.

During the Ur III period, Zabala was controlled by the Ur governor in Umma which was the capital of Umma Province.Cuneiform texts state that Hammurabi built Zabala's temple Ezi-Kalam-ma to the goddess Inanna.
The temple of Inanna in Zabalam is the subject of hymn 26 in the temple hymns of Enheduanna.

Archaeology
The site, which covers an areas of about 61 hectares, was first identified during the South Mesopotamian Mound Survey in 1954.
Beginning in the early 1900s, a great deal of illegal excavation occurred in Zabala. An example of writing from the time of Hammurabi was removed from Zabala during this period. This
activity reached a new height in the 1990s, at which time the Iraqi State Organization of Antiquities and Heritage authorized an official excavation, the
first at the site. Two seasons of excavation, in 2001 and 2002, occurred under the direction of Haider Al-Subaihawi. Several public and religious buildings were uncovered, a number of cuneiform tablets and an inscribed stone foundation cylinder of Warad-Sin, king of Larsa were found. A bronze sculpture (canephor, which is a form of Caryatid ), from Warad-Sin which mentions his father Kudur-Mabuk was also found. A further outbreak of archaeological looting at Zabala broke out after the 2003 War in Iraq.

Notes

See also

Cities of the ancient Near East

References
Andrew George, House Most High: The Temples of Ancient Mesopotamia (Mesopotamian Civilizations, Vol 5), Eisenbrauns, 1993, 
B. Alster, Geštinanna as Singer and the Chorus of Uruk and Zabalam: UET 6/1 22, JCS, vol. 37, pp. 219–28, 1985

External links
CDLI background on Zabala 
Year Names of Naram-Sin of Akkad
Year Names of Abisare of Larsa
Translation of Temple Hymns of Enheduanna 
Post 2003 war looting at Zabala 

Sumerian cities
Archaeological sites in Iraq
Former populated places in Iraq
Dhi Qar Governorate
2nd-millennium BC disestablishments
Inanna
Jemdet Nasr period
City-states